August Baumgartner (born 1877, date of death unknown) was an Austrian sports shooter. He competed in two events at the 1924 Summer Olympics.

References

External links
 

1877 births
Year of death missing
Austrian male sport shooters
Olympic shooters of Austria
Shooters at the 1924 Summer Olympics
Place of birth missing